Peking Pork is a meat dish that is a mistranslation. The name in Chinese means "Capital Rib," a name that is more common in Taiwan and overseas than in Mainland China itself. Its reference to Beijing, China is a misnomer. The dish actually refers to sweet and sour style of rib, which originated from Wuxi as Wuxi Fried Spare Ribs and then popularized overseas through Cantonese restaurants. The capital refers to the Nanjing capital, an area where sweet and sour cooking originated in China. This dish consists of crisp pork ribs that are marinated in a sweet red sauce. The pork should be firm and crisp, with a slightly sweet glaze that does not overwhelm the tenderness of the pork. Found in many Chinese and dim sum restaurants in Chinatown, this rare dish is not common in many Chinese restaurants elsewhere.

References

External links
Meals Matter Recipe
Rocky Mt. News
NY Time Food Review

Pork dishes